Folarin is a Yoruba name of Yoruba origin meaning "walk with wealth".

Notable persons with that name include:

Persons with the given name
Folarin Ogunsola (born 1997) Gambian swimmer
Folarin Campbell (born 1986) Nigerian-American basketball player
Folarin Madandola (born 1993)
Attended:Obafemi Awolowo University, Ile-Ife,OSun state,Nigeria 
Nigerian Estate Surveyor and Valuer
Folarin Adebusola-Quad I (born December 2nd)
Nigerian entrepreneur and business development/IT consultant
Folarin Komaiya (born 1985)
Public speaker and Technology Consultant

Persons with the surname
Adebesin Folarin (1877-1949) Nigerian judge
Teslim Folarin (born 1963) Nigerian politician
Tope Folarin (born 1981) Nigerian-American writer
Alani Folarin (1958-2018) Nigerian business tycoon 

Nigerian names
Yoruba given names
Yoruba-language surnames